Roger Federer's 2016 tennis season officially commenced on 3 January 2016, with the start of the Brisbane International, and ended on 8 July 2016, with a loss in the semifinals of the Wimbledon Championships.

This season saw Federer suffer from a knee injury which sidelined him for the majority of the year. After surgery, Federer returned but was hindered by a back injury which kept him out of the French Open, therefore ending his record of 65 consecutive appearances at Grand Slam tournaments.

On July 26 Federer officially ended his season early, not wanting to risk damaging his knee further. Federer would thus end the year at No. 16 in the ATP rankings, marking the first time that he dropped out of the top 10 since 2002. Additionally, this was the first season since 2000 in which Federer did not win a singles title.

Year summary

Early hard court season

Brisbane International
Federer opened his season at the Brisbane International for the third consecutive year, after winning the title in 2015. As the top seed, he received a bye in the first round. Although suffering with the flu virus, he beat Tobias Kamke in the second round in straight sets. He then defeated Grigor Dimitrov in three sets to advance to the semifinals. In the semifinals, he defeated Dominic Thiem in straight sets to advance to his third consecutive final at the tournament. He faced Milos Raonic in a repeat of last year's final, losing in straight sets. According with himself, Federer's performance was hindered throughout the tournament due to the flu virus.

Australian Open

Federer entered the Australian Open as the third seed. He defeated Nikoloz Basilashvili and Alexandr Dolgopolov, both in three straight sets to advance to the third round. There, he beat Grigor Dimitrov in four sets, in a win that marked Federer's 300th match win at a Grand Slam. He became the first man in the open era to reach this milestone and the second overall player behind Martina Navratilova, who won 306 matches. He reached the quarterfinals with an easy three set win over David Goffin in the fourth round. He then defeated Tomáš Berdych in straight sets to advance to his 12th Australian Open semifinal, where he faced Novak Djokovic in their first match of the year and their 45th meeting overall. Federer lost the match in four sets and this loss put Djokovic ahead in their rivalry for the first time.

Injury hiatus
In the day after his loss to Djokovic, Federer sustained a knee injury. In early February, he underwent arthroscopic surgery to repair a torn meniscus, thus missing both the scheduled Rotterdam Open and Dubai Tennis Championships. Later in the month, Federer announced he would also miss the Indian Wells Masters. In March, it was confirmed that he would make his return at the Miami Open.

Miami Open
As the third seed, and after a first round bye, Federer was scheduled to face Juan Martín del Potro in the second round in his comeback match. However, he would pull out of the tournament due to contracting a stomach virus, thus prolonging his time on the sidelines.

Spring clay court season

Monte-Carlo Masters
After a ten-week hiatus, Federer made his return at the first clay court Masters 1000 tournament, the Monte-Carlo Masters. As the third seed, he received a first round bye and in the second round won his first match since January by defeating Guillermo García López in straight sets to advance to the third round. He proceeded to defeat Roberto Bautista Agut to reach the quarterfinals, where he lost to Jo-Wilfried Tsonga in three sets despite being two points away from the win.

Madrid Open
Federer was expected to play the Madrid Open, but he was forced to withdraw from the tournament due to a back injury.

Italian Open
Upon pulling out of Madrid, Federer entered the Italian Open. Despite that, and after a first round bye, he stated that he almost withdrew prior to his opening round due to lingering fitness issues. However, after a morning practice, he decided to play rising teenage star Alexander Zverev, defeating him in straight sets. Again at the last minute, Federer decided to play his third round match against Dominic Thiem, but this time he was beaten in straight sets as the back injury continued to hamper his speed and movement. This tournament cast further doubt on Federer's participation in the upcoming French Open.

Federer ended up withdrawing from the second major of the year not wanting to further aggravate his injury before the start of the grass court season. That marked the end of his all-time record run of 65 consecutive appearances at majors, which began in the 2000 Australian Open.

Grass court season

Stuttgart Open
Federer took advantage of the recently expanded grass court season, first instituted in 2015, by playing in a newly minted grass court tournament, the Stuttgart Open. After a bye in the first round he started the tournament by defeating Taylor Fritz in three sets, in a rainy match played over two days. In the quarterfinals, he defeated qualifier Florian Mayer in straight sets, advancing to the semifinals. In the semifinals, he lost to No. 3 seed Dominic Thiem after holding two match points in the second set tiebreak. He lost a grass court match after having a match point for only the second time in his career.

Halle Open
Federer then entered the Halle Open as an eight-time champion and three-time defending champion. He defeated Jan-Lennard Struff, Malek Jaziri and David Goffin in the first three rounds, reaching the semifinals without losing a set in the process. In the semifinals, however, he lost to 19-year-old Alexander Zverev in three sets. Remarkably, this was the first time in which Federer lost before the final in this tournament since the 2002 edition.

Wimbledon

After a short break, Federer travelled to London to play Wimbledon, his second major of the year. He began the tournament with victories over Guido Pella, qualifier Marcus Willis, Daniel Evans and Steve Johnson, all in straight sets, reaching the quarterfinals in the process. In the quarterfinals he played and defeated Marin Čilić in an extremely tight match, in which he lost the first two sets before coming back to win the next three, saving three match points in the fourth set. However, he ended up losing to world No. 7 Milos Raonic in the semifinals after another tight five-setter.

Out for the rest of the season
On July 26 Federer announced that he would not play anymore in 2016, due to a knee injury, therefore not being able to defend his titles at the Cincinnati Masters and the Swiss Indoors as well as the runner-up position at the US Open. As a result, Federer dropped out of the top 5 in the ATP rankings for the first time since the week of 3 March 2014. His ranking also fell out of the top 10 for the first time since 2002, ending a remarkably 14-year streak. This was also the first season since 2000 in which Federer did not win a singles title in a calendar year.

All matches
This table chronicles all the matches of Roger Federer in 2016, including walkovers (W/O) which the ATP does not count as wins or losses.

Singles matches

Schedule

Singles schedule

Yearly records

Head-to-head matchups
Roger Federer has a  ATP match win–loss record in the 2016 season. Bold indicates player was ranked top 10 at time of at least one meeting. The following list is ordered by number of wins:

 Grigor Dimitrov 2–0
 David Goffin 2–0 
 Nikoloz Basilashvili 1–0
 Roberto Bautista Agut 1–0
 Tomáš Berdych 1–0
 Marin Čilić 1–0
 Alexandr Dolgopolov 1–0
 Daniel Evans 1–0
 Taylor Fritz 1–0
 Guillermo García-López 1–0
 Malek Jaziri 1–0
 Steve Johnson 1–0
 Tobias Kamke 1–0
 Florian Mayer 1–0
 Guido Pella 1–0
 Jan-Lennard Struff 1–0
 Marcus Willis 1–0
 Alexander Zverev 1–1
 Dominic Thiem 1–2
 Novak Djokovic 0–1
 Jo-Wilfried Tsonga 0–1
 Milos Raonic 0–2

Finals

Singles: 1 (1 runner-up)

Earnings

 Figures in United States dollars (USD) unless noted.

Awards
Stefan Edberg Sportsmanship Award
Record twelfth award in career (sixth consecutive)
ATPWorldTour.com Fans' Favourite
Record fourteenth consecutive award in career

See also
 2016 ATP World Tour
 2016 Rafael Nadal tennis season
 2016 Novak Djokovic tennis season
 2016 Andy Murray tennis season
 2016 Stan Wawrinka tennis season

References

External links
  
 ATP tour profile

Roger Federer tennis seasons
Federer
2016 in Swiss tennis
2016 in Swiss sport